Bato sa Buhangin is a 1976 Filipino romantic drama film directed by Pablo Santiago. It stars Fernando Poe Jr. and Vilma Santos in their second on-screen team up following the success of Batya't Palu-palo (1974). The film was released by FPJ Productions on August 13, 1976.

Plot
An intriguing revelation from a fortune teller leaves the spoiled Bamba (Vilma Santos) restless to meet her destined lover. One day, the anxious Bamba comes across the humble taxi driver Rafael (Fernando Poe Jr.) after their vehicles collide on the street. To make up for Bamba’s blunder, Bamba’s father offers the poor Rafael to work as his daughter’s bodyguard. Being the snotty brat she is, Bamba punishes Rafael by bossing him around and embarrassing him in front of her friends. Through it all, however, Bamba suddenly finds herself irresistibly falling in love with Rafael — the one man who has patiently put up with all her mischief. The only hurdle to Bamba and Rafael’s love story, though, is the secret Bamba has been keeping from everybody all her life – even to her beloved Rafael. Will this secret ruin the chance for Bamba to be with her fated partner?

Cast
Fernando Poe Jr. as Rafael "Paeng" Longalong
Vilma Santos as Barbara "Bamba" Montinola
Dencio Padilla as Lucio
Robert Talabis as Joseph
Millie Mercado as Rose
Connie Angeles as Gigi
Jun Soler as Gil
Jumbo Salvador as Teddy
Phillip Salvador as Phil
Yvonne Salcedo as Gelyn
Tina Monasterio as Lala
Rowell Santiago as Rowell
Fred Montilla as Mr. Montinola
Nello Nayo as Dr. Vergara
Imelda Ilanan as Lorna
Romy Diaz as Boy Hernandez
Mary Walter as Impong Sela
Alfonso Carvajal as Asst. Fiscal Magtanggol
Naty Hernando as The Taxi Operator
Ely Roque as The False Fortune Teller
Resty Samuel as The Motorcycle Policeman
Ruby Rose as Ms. San Diego, the private nurse

Reception

Music
The film's theme was written specifically for the film by Ernani Cuenco and Snaffu Rigor and performed by the latter's band, Cinderella.

Accolades

References

External links

1976 films
Filipino-language films
FPJ Productions films
Philippine romantic drama films
Films directed by Pablo Santiago